Joseph Dubosc, count of Pesquidoux (13 December 1869 in Savigny-lès-Beaune, Côte-d'Or – 17 March 1946 in Houga), also known as Joseph de Pesquidoux, was a French writer.

History 
In 1927 he won the Grand prix de littérature de l’Académie française, of which he was elected a member in 1936. In 1938, he was elected mainteneur of the Académie des Jeux floraux.

Works 
 Premiers vers (1896)
 Salomé (1898)
 Ramsès (1900)
 Le Sang fatal (1903)
 Chez nous - Travaux et jeux rustiques (1920)
 Sur la glèbe (1921)
 Le Livre de raison (3 volumes, 1925–1932)
 Caumont, duc de La Force (1931)
 L’Église et la Terre (1935)
 La Harde (1936)
 Gascogne (1939)
 Un Petit Univers (1940)
 Sol de France (1942)

External links
 

1869 births
1946 deaths
People from Côte-d'Or
20th-century French non-fiction writers
Members of the Académie Française
20th-century French male writers